The North Coast Road is a road 1,430 km in length, that connects Merak and Banyuwangi along the northern coast of Java, particularly between Jakarta and Surabaya.

The most part of Java north coast road was built during the reign of governor-general of the Dutch East Indies Herman Willem Daendels (1808–1811) and was originally known as the Great Post Road.

History of construction

The Great Post Road was a military road which was built under the order of King Lodewijk Napoleon who ruled the Kingdom of Holland at that time. the road was intended to ease military support, e.g. transfer of soldiers, in order to defend Java from possible British invasion. It connects Anyer in western end and Panarukan in eastern end of Java. After Daendels rule, the eastern road was later extended to Banyuwangi. The Java Great Post Road consist the most parts of present Java North Coast Road. However the original post road is runs through Preanger (Priangan, West Java) highland, from Meester Cornelis (Jatinegara) went south to Buitenzorg (Bogor), and went east to Cianjur, Bandung, Sumedang, and Cirebon. The current north coast road runs through coastal northern West Java which built later after the construction of Daendels' post road. It connects Bekasi, Karawang, Pamanukan, and Cirebon.

Most of today national road network in Java was built during Dutch East Indies era. However, during Suharto era around the 1980s, the toll road network system was introduced within the whole Java transportation network. The Java toll network highway is continuously expanded, and today some of these toll roads formed Java north coast road.

Extent

As the Great Post Road, it originally ran from Anyer in the west of Java to Panarukan in the east, but was later extended to Banyuwangi. In its current form the North Coast Road runs through five provinces: Banten, DKI Jakarta, West Java, Central Java and East Java. The port of Merak forms the western terminus, connecting with Bakauheni in Sumatra, the southern end of the Trans-Sumatran Highway. The eastern end is situated at Ketapang with connections to Gilimanuk in Bali. The North Coast Road also comprises , which is open to any vehicle.

Cities
The road connects the largest cities in Java, including Jakarta, Cilegon, Tangerang, Bekasi, Cirebon, Tegal, Pekalongan, Semarang, Rembang, Tuban, Surabaya, Pasuruan, Probolinggo and Banyuwangi.

Toll roads

The traffic of North Coast Road is gradually easing by the Trans-Java toll road and its complement toll roads.
 Tangerang–Merak Toll Road (Banten)
 Jakarta–Tangerang Toll Road (Banten)
 Jakarta Outer Ring Road (DKI Jakarta)
 Jakarta Inner Ring Road (DKI Jakarta)
 Jakarta–Cikampek Toll Road (West Java)
 Cikopo–Palimanan Toll Road (West Java)
 Palimanan–Kanci Toll Road (West Java)
 Kanci–Pejagan Toll Road (Central Java)
 Pejagan–Pemalang Toll Road (Central Java)
 Pemalang–Batang Toll Road (Central Java)
 Batang–Semarang Toll Road (Central Java)
 Semarang Toll Road (Central Java)
 Surabaya–Gresik Toll Road (East Java)
 Surabaya–Gempol Toll Road (East Java)

Volume and hazards
This road is a major route for land transportation, being used by a range of 20,000 to 70,000 vehicles daily. The state of the road varies in condition, which can seriously affect traffic-flow.

The North Coast Road is a major artery during the celebration of the Lebaran holiday, where transit is primarily west to east.

In Cikampek, there is a branch to Bandung (and cities of West Java in the southern part). In Tegal, there is a branch to Purwokerto (and the cities of Central Java in the southern part). In Semarang, there is a branch to east (Surabaya-Banyuwangi) and to the south (Solo-Madiun).

References

Highways in Indonesia
Asian Highway Network